Barry Dransfield (born 1947 in Harrogate, West Riding of Yorkshire), is an English folk singer, fiddler, cellist and guitarist. He has appeared as a session musician on numerous albums by other artists, and has released his own albums as well. The Rout of the Blues (1971) was voted Melody Maker folk album of the year. His 1972 album for Polydor simply called Barry Dransfield was voted the rarest folk album in Record Hunter, worth approximately £400. Unlike most fiddlers (but like some Appalachian players) he is comfortable playing in the "off the chest" position, instead of under the chin.

In 1969 Barry and his brother Robin Dransfield were invited by Ashley Hutchings to join the group which would become Steeleye Span, but turned the offer down.

Together with his brother Robin, he was a member of a bluegrass/old-time band while still in his teens. Always innovative, he generally avoids electric instruments. The instrumental "Blacksmith", on Fiddler's Dream, is a complex set of variations in Romantic Paganini style, with no obvious relation to the song "Blacksmith", but ending with a double-tracked voice of Dransfield singing the opening line, "Oh, A Blacksmith Courted Me". Fiddler's Dream has been re-issued on Castle with many bonus tracks.

In films 

Dransfield has composed music for several films for TV and the wide screen: S.O.S. Titanic, Adelaide Harris, Play Away, Samson an Delilah (1985), Ballymena Opera House and The Wreck of the Julie Plante (1985). He acted the part of the blind fiddler in The Bounty (1984) (with Mel Gibson and Anthony Hopkins). In 1986, he changed career to become a so-called "Fiddle Doctor", repairing violins and cellos. In 1994, he joined the Steeleye Span UK tour.

Discography 

 Rout of the Blues (1970) (with Robin Dransfield)
 Lord of All I Behold (1971) (with Robin Dransfield)
 Morris On (1972) (with Ashley Hutchings, Richard Thompson, John Kirkpatrick et al.)
 Barry Dransfield (1972)
 The Fiddler's Dream (1976) as a member of the band The Dransfields
 Popular to Contrary Belief (1977) (with Robin Dransfield)
 Bowin' and Scrapin''' (1978)
 Be Your Own Man (1994)
 Troubadours of British Folk, Vol. 1 (1995) (anthology)
 Wings Of TheSphinx (1996)
 Up To Now (1997) (compilation with rarities and unreleased tracks)
 Unruly'' (2005)

External links 
 Official website: Barry Dransfield
 

Living people
English fiddlers
British male violinists
British folk rock musicians
21st-century violinists
21st-century British male musicians
The Albion Band members
1947 births
Topic Records artists